Dunama mattonii is a moth in the family Notodontidae. It is found in Ecuador.

The length of the forewings is 16–18 mm for males and about 20 mm for females. The ground color is a mixture of reddish brown and beige-colored scales. The veins are lined with gray-brown, especially distally. The anal fold and cubitus are purplish brown and the orbicular spot is diffuse and blackish brown. The hindwings are dirty gray-brown, but lighter near the base.

The larvae feed on Geonoma orbignyana.

Etymology
The species is named in honor of Rudi Mattoni (Buenos Aires, Argentina) for his ongoing support of biodiversity research on Neotropical Lepidoptera.

References

Moths described in 2011
Notodontidae of South America